Kitami Observatory is an astronomical observatory in the Kitami-Abashiri Region Cultural Centre in eastern Hokkaidō, Japan. Its observatory code is 400. It is 0.72344 Earth radii from the rotation axis and +0.68811 Earth radii from the equatorial plane, 143.7827 degrees east of Greenwich.

The amateur astronomers Atsushi Takahashi and Kazuro Watanabe discovered many asteroids here. , 680 discoveries have been made at Kitami.

See also 
 Kin Endate
 List of observatories
 List of asteroid-discovering observatories
 Tetsuya Fujii

Notes

External links 
 Kitami Region Museum of Science History and Art official website 

Astronomical observatories in Japan
Museums in Hokkaido
Minor-planet discovering observatories
Kitami, Hokkaido
Planetaria in Japan
Museums established in 1987
1987 establishments in Japan

ja:北網圏北見文化センター#施設・展示